Werk 80 II is the eighth full-length album by German industrial gothic metal band Atrocity, released on February 29, 2008 and their 2nd full-length cover album after the original Werk 80 album released in 1997. Burlesque artist Dita Von Teese is the cover model.

History
Released on the same day, there was a limited edition with one bonus track, and a two-disc version which collected both Werk 80 albums, including bonus tracks for the original album which had been released as B-sides or bonus tracks on singles.

Track listing

Standard release
 "People Are People" (Martin Gore) – 3:43 (Depeche Mode cover) 
 "Smalltown Boy" (Bronski Beat) – 5:10 (Bronski Beat cover) 
 "Relax" (Peter Gill, Holly Johnson, Brian Nash, Mark O'Toole) – 3:47 (Frankie Goes to Hollywood cover) 
 "Don't You Forget about Me" (Keith Forsey, Steve Schiff) – 4:27 (Simple Minds cover) 
 "The Sun Always Shines on T.V." (Pal Waaktaar) – 4:48 (A-Ha cover) 
 "Hey Little Girl" (Iva Davies) – 4:27 (Icehouse cover) 
 "Fade to Grey" (Billy Currie, Christopher Payne, Midge Ure) – 3:26 (Visage cover) 
 "Such a Shame" (Mark Hollis) – 4:11 (Talk Talk cover) 
 "Keine Heimat" (Ideal) – 3:45 (Ideal cover) 
 "Here Comes the Rain Again" (Annie Lennox, Dave Stewart) – 4:47 (Eurythmics cover) 
 "Forever Young" (Alphaville) – 3:48 (Alphaville cover)

Limited edition bonus track
 "Feels Like Heaven" (Eddie Jordan, Kevin Patterson) – 4:04 (Fiction Factory cover)

Werk 80 II limited deluxe edition
The limited two disc edition was released with on the second disc a re-pressing of the original Werk 80 with additional bonus tracks that had been previously released as tracks on the fourth side of the LP and two extra tracks of singles released from Werk 80: "Tainted Love (Albrin-mix)" and "Shout (Edit)".

Personnel

Atrocity
Alexander Krull: vocals, keyboards, programming, sampling
Mathias Roderer: guitars
Thorsten Bauer: guitars
Christopher Lukhaup: bass
Moritz Neuner: drums, percussion

Additional musicians
Liv Kristine: additional lead and backing vocals
Timon Birkhofer: additional keyboards
In Takt: Choir; conducted by Martin Dennemarck and Claudia Bittner

Production
Recorded, produced, mixed and mastered by Alexander Krull
Engineered by Alexander Krull and Ingmar Schelzel
Assistant engineers: Mathias Roderer, Thorsten Bauer

Singles

References

External links
 Review: Atrocity – Werk 80 II
 "Werk 80 II at discogs

2008 albums
Atrocity (band) albums
Covers albums
Albums produced by Alexander Krull